Alma Allen was a member of the Danish Resistance against the Nazis in World War II in the early 1940s. She personally led women on a dozen combat missions against the Nazis. She eventually joined British intelligence.

References

Year of birth missing
Possibly living people
Danish people of World War II
Women in European warfare
Danish female resistance members